Schoenberg is a crater on Mercury.  Its name was adopted by the International Astronomical Union (IAU) in 1976. The crater is named for Austrian composer Arnold Schoenberg.

Schoenberg has a ray system.

To the east of Schoenberg is the Beethoven basin.  To the northwest is the crater Mark Twain.

References

Impact craters on Mercury